Boise is a neighborhood in the North and Northeast sections of Portland, Oregon. It is approximately bounded by Interstate 5 on the west, N Skidmore St. on the north, NE Rodney Ave. on the east, and N Kerby St. and NE Fremont St. on the south. The southern portion of N Mississippi Ave. forms the commercial core of the area. The neighborhood was named in honor of Reuben P. Boise, a Portland School Board member during the 1850s.

In the mid-20th century, Boise residents included a high percentage of African Americans, relative to other Portland neighborhoods. This changed rapidly in the 2000s. The 2000 Census recorded 48% of the population identifying as Black or African American, either alone or mixed with another race. By the time of the 2010 Census, this number had fallen to 26.6%, largely supplanted by Whites. This demographic change has accompanied rapid development and gentrification in the neighborhood.

References

External links
 
 Boise Neighborhood Association official site
 Boise Eliot Neighborhood Guide (PortlandNeighborhood.com)
 Boise Voices Oral History Project (Boise neighborhood oral history project, local youth interview elders from the community)
Boise Street Tree Inventory Report

 
Neighborhoods in Portland, Oregon
North Portland, Oregon
Northeast Portland, Oregon